Degradation is the formal term for removal of a knighthood or other honour. The last knight to be publicly degraded was Sir Francis Mitchell in 1621. More recent examples include Sir Roger Casement, whose knighthood was canceled for treason during the First World War, and Sir Anthony Blunt, whose knighthood was withdrawn in 1979. The most recent degradations centre on the fallout from the banking crisis at the end of the first decade of the twenty-first century. Examples include Sir Fred Goodwin, the former Chief Executive of the Royal Bank of Scotland, who lost his knighthood in 2012 over his role in the bank's near-collapse in 2008 and Sir James Crosby, the former Chief Executive of HBOS.

References

See also 
 Revocation

Knights
Chivalry
British knights